Plautus Productions was an American television and film production company during the 1960s. The company was founded by producer and director Herbert Brodkin.

Plautus Productions was best known as the production company for some of CBS's popular crime dramas including Brenner, The Defenders, The Nurses  (also known as The Doctors and the Nurses), and Coronet Blue, along with NBC's Espionage, the only Plautus production produced for a network other than CBS.

Plautus Productions was a television subsidiary of Paramount Pictures.

History

Plautus Productions was formed in 1959 by producer Herbert Brodkin and Paramount Pictures. The main sole purpose of the company at time of its founding was to provide production and distribution services to Brodkin's new series Brenner which premiered on CBS that same year.

After finding success with Brenner, Brodkin, who served as the president of the company, used that company to produce some of his other television series.

The company closed in 1967, two years after Brodkin, along with fellow producer and business associate Robert "Buzz" Berger founded Titus Productions which took most of Brodkin's attention away from Plautus.

Ownership and distribution of television properties
Brenner, The Defenders, The Nurses, For the People and Coronet Blue all ran on CBS and are presently owned and distributed by CBS Media Ventures.

Espionage, which ran for one season on NBC, was co-produced by ATV, an ITV contractor in the United Kingdom. Though distributed by the now defunct ITC Entertainment outside of the United Kingdom, the program's distribution rights are now with Metro-Goldwyn-Mayer, which also owns the program.

Productions by Plautus

References

Television production companies of the United States
Film production companies of the United States
Paramount Pictures